Estadio Plaza El Coliseo is a bull-fighting stadium in Trujillo, La Libertad, Peru. The stadium holds 8,000 people.

References

Trujillo
Buildings and structures in Trujillo, Peru